Thomas Hervé Basila (born 30 April 1999) is a French professional footballer who plays as a defender for  club Nancy, on loan from Belgian First Division A club Oostende.

Club career
Basila made his professional debut for Nantes in a 2–1 Ligue 1 win over Lyon on 12 April 2019.

International career
Basila represented the France U19s at the 2018 UEFA European Under-19 Championship.

References

External links

 
 
 
 

1999 births
Living people
Footballers from Orléans
French footballers
Association football defenders
France youth international footballers
FC Nantes players
K.V. Oostende players
AS Nancy Lorraine players
Ligue 1 players
Ligue 2 players
Championnat National 2 players
Championnat National 3 players
French expatriate footballers
French expatriate sportspeople in Belgium
Expatriate footballers in Belgium
Black French sportspeople